List of communities in Shelburne County, Nova Scotia

Communities are ordered by the highway upon which they are located.  All routes start with the terminus located near the largest community.

Trunk Routes

Trunk 3: Sable River - Allendale - East Jordan - Jordan Falls - Shelburne - Birchtown - Crowell - Barrington Passage - Doctors Cove - Shag Harbour - Lower Woods Harbour - Upper Woods Harbour - Charlesville

Arterial Highways

Highway 103:Granite Village -Sable River - Jordan Falls - Birchtown - Clyde River - Oak Park

Collector Roads

Route 203: Shelburne - Lower Ohio - Middle Ohio - Upper Ohio
Route 309: Clyde River - Port Clyde- Thomasville - Eel Bay - Centreville - Villagedale- Barrington
Route 330: Centreville- Clark's Harbour

Communities located on rural roads

Atlantic
Baccaro
Blanche
Churchover
East Green Harbour 
East Side of Ragged Island 
Forbes Point
Greenwood
Gunning Cove
Ingomar
Jordan Bay
Jordan Ferry
Little Harbour
Little Port l'Hébert
Lockeport
Louis Head
Middle Clyde River
North West Harbour
Port L'Hebert
Port Saxon
Rockland 
Roseway
Round Bay
Sandy Point
Smithville
The Hawk
Upper Clyde River
Welshtown
West Baccaro
West Green Harbour

See also

Shelburne County, Nova Scotia

Geography of Shelburne County, Nova Scotia